Gedney is a village, civil parish and electoral ward in the South Holland district of Lincolnshire, England. The parish stretches east to The Wash, its villages and hamlets including Dawsmere, Gedney Broadgate, Gedney Drove End, Gedney Dyke, Gedney Marsh, and the geographic extension of Gedney Church End.

History
A hospital for five paupers, (St Thomas Martyr), was founded at Gedney, date unknown, and served from North Creake.  It was dissolved around 1339.

The redundant railway station was on the former east–west Midland and Great Northern Joint Railway. It closed in 1959.

The Red House wind farm was built in 2006 with six MM82 wind turbines, its 12MW of power feeding 6,500 homes.

Geography

Gedney and its parish lies on reclaimed fenland, making it one of the most intensive crop-growing areas in the UK.

To the west, the parish begins at the eastern end of the Fleet Hargate bypass, and includes the village's campsite and a few houses, bordering the parish of Fleet. The boundary passes close to the west of Gedney Dyke, and meets the parish of Holbeach. It passes just to the west of Gedney Dyke Farm then follows Fleet Haven, near to the wind farm to the west of nearby Red House Farm.

It deviates to the east from Fleet Haven and passes to the west of (another) Red House Farm then rejoins Fleet Haven just south of Wards Farm. Fleet Haven runs out of land and meets the sea wall. In the parish, and close to the east is the base of RAF Holbeach which is accessed via Durham's Road. The parish extends out on the mud flats along Fleet Haven Outfall. To access the part of the parish along the start of The Wash would be extremely foolish and is out of bounds due to the bombing range. The limit of the parish finishes between Gat Sea End and Old South Middle. There are observation towers on the sea wall for the bombing range. The control tower is on the sea wall towards Dawsmere and Gedney Drove End. Dawsmere Creek extends out towards The Wash. The boundary with Lutton is along Boatmere Creek then extends out to sea along Tycho Wing's Channel, which is the outflow of the River Nene. This area is the far west of The Wash NNR.

The boundary passes to the north of Lodge Farm, broadly following Boatmere Creek, south of Boat Mere Farm then along The Chase. It crosses Roman Bank at Sutton Corner, passing to the west of Lutton. It follows Docking's Holt Lane to the west of Long Sutton, meeting the B1359 at the Garnsgate Road junction. It follows the B1359 (former A17) to the west, then crosses the A17 then follows a drain and Garnsgate Road where it borders Long Sutton and partly follows National Cycle Route 1. It passes to the north of Moorswood Farm, then follows Benderslough Drove and then the South Holland Main Drain, where it borders Sutton St James to the south. At Leedsgate Bridge, west of Inley Drove Farm, it meets the parish of Fleet.

North of Leedsgate Bridge, the parish follows Fleet Drain, to the left of Rookery Farm, and it crosses the B1165 and the Little South Holland Drain at Raven's Gate Bridge. The boundary follows Fleet Drain north-eastwards alongside Raven's Drove. The two sides of the boundary are respectively known as Fleet Fen and Gedney Fen. Fleet Drain also follows Delph Bank. To the east of Fleet Drain at this point is Gedney Broadgate.

Church

Gedney Grade I listed Anglican parish church is dedicated to St Mary Magdalene. Originating in the 13th century, additions and alterations carried-on into the 17th. It was considerably restored in 1890 however the spire to the tower was unfinished and left as a stump. The tower,  to its parapet, has Early English lower stages and Perpendicular upper. The nave arcades and the chancel are of Decorated style. During the rebuilding of the south aisle in 1890 a brass of a female (ca. 1390), with a puppy at her feet, was discovered. Also in the south aisle is a damaged 13th-century effigy of a cross-legged knight, conjectured to represent Falco D'Oyry, and Jacobean alabaster monuments of Adlard Welby, his wife Cassandra and their five children, erected in 1605. The south porch has a rare upper chamber. At the east end of the north aisle are the remains of a 14th-century Jesse window.

The church had 29 windows damaged in 2006, including the Jesse window. Vestments and an altar cloth were set alight but the fire did not take hold. Two culprits, 15 and 16 years old, were interviewed by police and admitted causing the damage.

Amenities
Parish public houses are the Chequers on Gedney Dyke Main Street, the Grade II listed Old Black Lion in Chapelgate, and the Rising Sun.

References

External links

"Gedney", Genuki.org.uk. Retrieved 6 August 2011
 Parish Council

Villages in Lincolnshire
Civil parishes in Lincolnshire
South Holland, Lincolnshire
Wind farms in England